Demon Slayer may refer to:
 Demon hunter, a person who studies and hunts demons
 Demon Slayer (shogi), a trap opening in shogi
 Demon Slayer: Kimetsu no Yaiba, a Japanese manga and anime series
 Demon Slayer: Kimetsu no Yaiba – The Movie: Mugen Train, a 2020 anime film
 Demon Slayer: Kimetsu no Yaiba – The Hinokami Chronicles, a 2021 video game
 Demon Slayer Corps, a fictional organization
 Demon Slayers, fictional families in the manga and anime series Omamori Himari
 Demon Slayers, a fictional clan formed by Sango, Kohaku, and other characters in the manga and anime series Inuyasha
 Demon-Slayer Sword, a fictional sword used by Asta in the manga and anime series Black Clover
 Megami Tensei Gaiden: Last Bible, also titled Revelations: The Demon Slayer, a 1992 video game
 Wu Kong (film), also titled Immortal Demon Slayer, a 2017 film

See also  
 Devil-Slayer, a Marvel Comics character